Wayne Township is one of the ten townships of Fayette County, Ohio, United States. As of the 2010 census the population was 1,387.

Geography
Located in the southeastern part of the county, it borders the following townships:
Marion Township - north
Perry Township, Pickaway County - northwest corner
Deerfield Township, Ross County - far east
Concord Township, Ross County - southeast
Buckskin Township, Ross County - far south
Madison Township, Highland County - south corner
Perry Township - west
Union Township - northwest

Wayne Township is the only township in Fayette County to border Ross County, other than at a corner point.

No municipalities are located in Wayne Township, although the unincorporated community of Good Hope lies in the township's center.

Name and history
It is one of twenty Wayne Townships statewide.

In 1833, Wayne Township contained one gristmill and two saw mills.

Government
The township is governed by a three-member board of trustees, who are elected in November of odd-numbered years to a four-year term beginning on the following January 1. Two are elected in the year after the presidential election and one is elected in the year before it. There is also an elected township fiscal officer, who serves a four-year term beginning on April 1 of the year after the election, which is held in November of the year before the presidential election. Vacancies in the fiscal officership or on the board of trustees are filled by the remaining trustees.

References

External links
County website

Townships in Fayette County, Ohio
Townships in Ohio